Oğuz, formerly known as Vartashen (Vartaşen, from ), is a city, municipality and the capital of the Oghuz District of Azerbaijan. The village was populated by Armenians and Udis before the exodus of Armenians from Azerbaijan after the outbreak of the Nagorno-Karabakh conflict.

Etymology 
Before 1991 the town was called Vartashen, which means town of roses in Armenian; 'Vard' meaning rose and 'shen' meaning town or village. This is in reference to the abundance of roses that naturally grow in this place. A colophon on Armenian manuscript dating to 1466 suggests possibly earlier bilingual variants of the name: Giwlstan, and Vardud.

The town was renamed to Oghuz in 1991 during the expulsion of the Armenian and autochthonous Udi-speaking population. The name Oghuz, given to the town in 1991, was taken from the old Turkic tribe of Oghuz.

Population 
Until 1991, Vartashen was mainly a Udi village, where the Vartashen dialect of the Udi language was spoken by about 3000 people in the 1980s. The Udis of Vartashen belonged to the Armenian and Gregorian Church and had Armenian surnames. 

During the Nagorno-Karabakh conflict, most Udis of the town were expelled by the local activists of Popular Front of Azerbaijan. The Udis, bearing Armenian names and belonging to both the Armenian and the Gregorian Church, had been viewed as Armenians and hence suffered the same fate as other Armenians in Azerbaijan. Some 50 Udi people remained in the town.

There were also Tat-speaking Mountain Jews in Vartashen. Most of them have emigrated to Israel, but possibly 80 have stayed.

Twin towns — sister cities
Oghuz is twinned with:
 Nova Gorica, Slovenia

References

External links

 Бежанов М. Краткие сведения о селе Варташен и его жителях // СМОМПК. Тифлис, 1892. Вып. 14.

Populated places in Oghuz District
Elizavetpol Governorate